The Europe Zone was one of the three regional zones of the 1955 Davis Cup.

24 teams entered the Europe Zone, with the winner going on to compete in the Inter-Zonal Zone against the winners of the America Zone and Eastern Zone. Italy defeated Sweden in the final and progressed to the Inter-Zonal Zone.

Draw

First round

Norway vs. South Africa

West Germany vs. Ireland

Austria vs. Finland

Turkey vs. Egypt

Monaco vs. Argentina

Switzerland vs. Netherlands

Yugoslavia vs. Chile

Portugal vs. Czechoslovakia

Second round

Denmark vs. South Africa

West Germany vs. Italy

Austria vs. Great Britain

Egypt vs. India

France vs. Argentina

Switzerland vs. Sweden

Hungary vs. Chile

Czechoslovakia vs. Belgium

Quarterfinals

Denmark vs. Italy

Great Britain vs. India

Sweden vs. France

Belgium vs. Chile

Semifinals

Great Britain vs. Italy

Sweden vs. Chile

Final

Italy vs. Sweden

References

External links
Davis Cup official website

Davis Cup Europe/Africa Zone
Europe Zone
Davis Cup